John Bassett Moore (December 3, 1860 – November 12, 1947) was an American lawyer and authority on international law. Moore was a State Department official, a professor at Columbia University, and a judge of the Permanent Court of International Justice from 1922 to 1928, the first American judge to sit on that judicial body.

Biography
Moore graduated from the University of Virginia and was admitted to the Delaware bar in 1883. He practiced law in Wilmington, Delaware, before working as a law clerk at the Department of State from 1885 to 1886. He was the third assistant secretary of state from 1886 to 1891, when he became Hamilton Fish Professorship of International Law and Diplomacy at Columbia Law School, the first chair of international law in the United States. Moore remained a Columbia professor until 1924, taking frequent leaves of absence to take up U.S. diplomatic posts.

Moore briefly was assistant secretary of state in 1898.

During his service with the Department of State he acted as secretary to the Conference on Samoan Affairs (1887) and to the Fisheries Conference (1887–1888).

After the close of the war with Spain was secretary and council to the American Peace Commission at Paris. In 1901, he served as professor of International Law at the Naval War College, where he initiated that college's long series of "International Law Blue Book" publications. Subsequently, Moore represented the government as agent before the United States and Dominican Arbitration Tribunal (1904), as delegate to the Fourth International American Conference at Buenos Aires and special plenipotentiary to the Chilean centenary (both 1910), and as delegate to the International Commission of Jurists at Rio de Janeiro (1912).

He was on the Hague Tribunal from 1912 to 1938.

In 1921, Moore was elected a judge of the Permanent Court of International Justice. While on the bench, he declined the position of the court presidency multiple times, arguing that an overseas judge should not hold that position. He resigned from the court in 1928 in order to focus on his scientific obligations. 

Moore resigned his professorship at Columbia in 1924.

Moore was a proponent of neutrality, believing that the post-World War I system of alliances would tend to broaden wars into global conflicts. He was also a strong believer in the principle of separation of powers under the United States Constitution, asserting in 1921, "There can hardly be room for doubt that the framers of the constitution, when they vested in Congress the power to declare war, never imagined that they were leaving it to the executive to use the military and naval forces of the United States all over the world for the purpose of actually coercing other nations, occupying their territory, and killing their soldiers and citizens, all according to his own notions of the fitness of things, as long as he refrained from calling his action war or persisted in calling it peace."

Legacy and awards

Moore was honored on a U.S. definitive postage stamp issued December 3, 1966, the five-dollar value of the Prominent Americans series.

In 1922, a new school was dedicated to Moore in his hometown of Smyrna, Delaware. The John Bassett Moore Intermediate School now serves as a public school for the fifth and sixth grades.

In 1927, Moore was awarded the Theodore Roosevelt Medal.

Moore died at his home in New York City on November 12, 1947, and was buried in Woodlawn Cemetery.

Works
Reports on Extraterritorial Crime (1887)
Extradition and Interstate Rendition (two volumes, 1891)
American Notes on the Conflict of Laws (1896)
History and Digest of International Arbitrations (6 vols., 1898)
American Diplomacy (1905)
Digest of International Law (8 vols., 1906)
Works of James Buchanan (12 vols., 1909–1911, reissued 1960)
Four Phases of American Development (1912)
International Law and Some Current Illusions (1924)
The Permanent Court of International Justice (1924)
International Adjudications, Ancient and Modern (8 vols., 1937)
Collected Papers (7 vols., 1945)

References

Sister projects

Further reading

External links
 

1860 births
1947 deaths
People from Smyrna, Delaware
American legal scholars
American legal writers
Columbia University faculty
United States Assistant Secretaries of State
American diplomats
Naval War College faculty
International law scholars
American jurists
University of Virginia alumni
Permanent Court of International Justice judges
Members of the Permanent Court of Arbitration
Members of the Institut de Droit International
Delaware Republicans
New York (state) Republicans
American judges of international courts and tribunals
Burials at Woodlawn Cemetery (Bronx, New York)